Wind(s) of Change may refer to:

Books 
Winds of Change, the 2021 manga novel in the Warriors series by Erin Hunter
Wind of Change, romantic novel by Nora Roberts
Wind of Change: The Scorpions Story, by Martin Popoff 
The Winds of Change and Other Stories, a collection of short stories by Isaac Asimov
The Winds of Change (Richard Jury Mysteries) by Martha Grimes
Winds of Change, novel by Anna Jacobs
Winds of Change (Lackey novel), a 1994 novel by Mercedes Lackey
Winds of Change: The Future of Democracy in Iran, a 2002 book by Reza Pahlavi, Crown Prince of Iran
Winds of Change: Britain in the Early Sixties, by Peter Hennessy
Winds of Change: The Roman Catholic Church and Society in Wales, 1916–1962, by Trystan Owain Hughes

Film and television
The Wind of Change (film), a 1961 British film
Winds of Change (1979 film) or Metamorphoses, an anime film
Winds of Change, the working title for the 2012 film Midnight's Children
Wind of Change (Bangladeshi TV program), a music performance show
"Winds of Change", an episode of Ninjago: Possession, the fifth season of Ninjago: Masters of Spinjitzu

Music 
Wind of Change (band), an American hardcore band

Albums
Winds of Change (Eric Burdon & the Animals album) or its title song
Wind of Change (album), a 1972 album by Peter Frampton
Winds of Change (Jefferson Starship album) or its title song
Wind of Change, a 2009 album by Sound of the Blue Heart

Songs
"Wind of Change" (Scorpions song) (1990)
"Winds of Change", from the Beach Boys' M.I.U. Album
"Wind of Change", a song from the Bee Gees album Main Course
"Winds of Change", from the Black Hour Sins Remain
"Wind of Change", from the Acoustic Alchemy album AArt
"Wind of Change", from the Badger album One Live Badger
"The Winds of Change", from the Mike Batt album Waves
"Winds of Change", from the Cinderella album Heartbreak Station
"Wind of Change", from the Hawkwind album Hall of the Mountain Grill
"Winds of Change", from the Kutless album Hearts of the Innocent
"Winds of Change" from the Russ Taff album The Way Home
"The Wind of Change", by Robert Wyatt with the SWAPO Singers
"Winds of Change", from the Y&T album Black Tiger
"Winds of Change", by Firefall from the Elan

Other uses
"Wind of Change" (speech), a 1960 speech by British Prime Minister Harold Macmillan to the Parliament of South Africa
Winds of Change (magazine), published by the American Indian Science and Engineering Society
The Winds of Change, a wrestling maneuver used by Wade Barrett